Zaur, Zaurovo — an old Ingush village, which was located on the right bank of the Terek and in the Tarskoy Valley. On its territory the fortress Vladikavkaz was founded in 1784.

Etymology 
Zovr-kov translates from the Ingush as "frontier outpost". Russian historian  described the Ingush village as a settlement that occupied a terrain from which the surroundings to distant space were visible. The village laid on the path leading across the Caucasus from north to south, and according to Butkov, was called by the Armenians Zura, by the Byzantines Tzur, and by Arab writers Suariag and Saul.

History 

Julius Klaproth (1812):

 (1823):

 (1911):

  Johanna Nichols (2004):

Notes

References

Bibliography 
 
 
 
 
 
 
 

History_of_Ingushetia
Vladikavkaz